Charmaine Smith may refer to:

 Charmaine Smith (bowls), Australian Paralympic lawn bowler
 Charmaine Smith (rugby union) (born 1990), New Zealand rugby union player